The Wyoming Cowboys college football team competes as part of the NCAA Division I Football Bowl Subdivision (FBS), representing the University of Wyoming in the Mountain West Conference (MW). Since the establishment of the team in 1892, Wyoming has appeared in 17 bowl games. The latest bowl occurred on December 21, 2021, when Wyoming defeated Kent State in the 2021 Famous Idaho Potato Bowl. The win in that game brought the Cowboys' overall bowl record to nine wins and eight losses (9–8).

Key

Bowl games

Notes

References
General

Specific

Wyoming Cowboys

Wyoming Cowboys bowl games